Pešek (feminine Pešková) is a Czech surname, it may refer to:
 Jakub Pešek, Czech footballer
 Jiří Pešek, Czech footballer
 Josef Pešek, Czech ice dancer
 Karel Pešek, Czech football and ice hockey player
 Karel Pešek, Czech motorcycle racer
 Ladislav Pešek, Czech actor
 Libor Pešek, Czech conductor
 Luděk Pešek (1919–1999), Czech artist and novelist
 Lukáš Pešek, Czech motorcycle racer
 Vlasta Pešková, Czech athlete

Surnames of Czech origin
Czech-language surnames